Coon Hollow is a valley in Washington County in the U.S. state of Missouri.

Coon Hollow was so named on account of raccoons in the area.

References

Valleys of Washington County, Missouri
Valleys of Missouri